Viktor Kubal (20 March 1923 in Svätý Jur – 24 April 1997 in Bratislava) was a Slovak cartoonist, animator, filmmaker, and director, best remembered for directing the cartoon Puf a Muf (1969-1973), and the animated films Zbojník Jurko (1976), and Krvavá pani (1980). He has been called the father of animation in Slovakia and has been noted for making the first animated feature film in Slovakia. He also collaborated with Vladimir Kubenko.

References 

1923 births
1997 deaths
Slovak filmmakers
Cartoonists
Animators
Slovak artists
Slovak directors